Saudi-Yemeni War may refer to:
 1931 Saudi–Yemeni border skirmish
 Saudi–Yemeni War (1934)
 Saudi Arabian-led intervention in Yemen